The 2007 Scottish Parliament election was held on Thursday 3 May 2007 to elect members to the Scottish Parliament. It was the third general election to the devolved Scottish Parliament since it was created in 1999. Local elections in Scotland fell on the same day.

The Scottish National Party emerged as the largest party with 47 seats, closely followed by the incumbent Scottish Labour Party with 46 seats. The Scottish Conservatives won 17 seats, the Scottish Liberal Democrats 16 seats, the Scottish Greens 2 seats and one Independent (Margo MacDonald) was also elected. The SNP initially approached the Liberal Democrats for a coalition government, but the Lib Dems turned them down. Ultimately, the Greens agreed to provide the numbers to vote in an SNP minority government, with SNP leader Alex Salmond as First Minister.

The Scottish Socialist Party and the Scottish Senior Citizens Unity Party, which won seats in the 2003 election, lost all of their seats. Former MSP Tommy Sheridan's new party, Solidarity, also failed to win any seats. Campbell Martin and Dr Jean Turner both lost their seats, and Dennis Canavan and Brian Monteith retired.

Background

The main issues during the campaign trail were healthcare, education, council tax reform, pensions, the Union, Trident (the submarines are based in Scotland), the Iraq War and more powers for the Scottish Parliament. Some parties proposed raise the school leaving age from 16 to 18 and raising the minimum age to purchase tobacco products from 16 to 18.

Jack McConnell, as First Minister, entered the election defending a small overall majority of five seats via a coalition of Labour and the Liberal Democrats. The Lab-LD social liberal coalition had been in power, with three different First Ministers, since the first Scottish Parliament election in 1999. Opinion polls suggested its majority could be lost in 2007, due to falling support for the Labour Party and rising support for other parties, in particular the Scottish National Party (SNP). The polls suggested that no single party was likely to acquire an overall majority, nor was there an obvious alternative coalition ready to form a new Executive.

A TNS Poll in November 2006 gave Labour an 8% lead over the SNP which was second behind Labour in terms of numbers of Members of the Scottish Parliament (MSPs). As the election approached the SNP gained support while Labour's support declined. Based on pre-election projections, there could have been some possibility of an SNP–Liberal Democrat coalition, which might have extended to include the Scottish Green Party. The other parties represented in the Parliament before the election were the Scottish Conservative Party, the Scottish Socialist Party (SSP), Solidarity and the Scottish Senior Citizens Unity Party. (Solidarity is a new party, having broken away from the SSP in 2006.)

Other parties that campaigned for seats in Holyrood included the United Kingdom Independence Party (UKIP), the British National Party (BNP), the Scottish Unionist Party, the Scottish Socialist Labour Party, the Christian Peoples Alliance, the Scottish Christian Party.

Retiring MSPs

Labour
Susan Deacon, Edinburgh East and Musselburgh
John Home Robertson, East Lothian
Janis Hughes, Glasgow Rutherglen
Kate Maclean, Dundee West

Scottish National Party
Bruce McFee, West of Scotland list
George Reid, Ochil

Conservative
Phil Gallie, South of Scotland list
James Douglas-Hamilton, Lothians list

Liberal Democrats
Donald Gorrie, Central Scotland list
Jim Wallace, Orkney

Scottish Socialist Party
Frances Curran, West of Scotland list

Independents
Dennis Canavan, Falkirk West
Brian Monteith (elected as a Conservative), Mid Scotland and Fife list

Defeated MSPs

Labour
Gordon Jackson, Glasgow Govan
Sylvia Jackson, Stirling
Margaret Jamieson, Kilmarnock and Loudoun
Maureen Macmillan, Highlands and Islands
Christine May, Fife Central
Alasdair Morrison, Western Isles
Bristow Muldoon, Livingston
Allan Wilson, Cunninghame North

Lib Dem
Andrew Arbuckle, Mid Scotland and Fife
Nora Radcliffe, Gordon
Euan Robson, Roxburgh and Berwickshire
George Lyon, Argyll and Bute

Conservative
Dave Petrie, Highlands and Islands
Murray Tosh, West of Scotland

Scottish Greens
Shiona Baird, North East Scotland
Chris Ballance, South of Scotland
Mark Ballard, Lothians
Mark Ruskell, Mid Scotland and Fife
Eleanor Scott, Highlands and Islands

Scottish Socialist Party
Colin Fox, Lothians
Rosie Kane, Glasgow
Carolyn Leckie, Central Scotland

Solidarity
Rosemary Byrne, South of Scotland - originally elected as Scottish Socialist Party
Tommy Sheridan, Glasgow - originally elected as Scottish Socialist Party

Scottish Senior Citizens Unity Party
John Swinburne, Central Scotland

Independent
Campbell Martin, West of Scotland - Former SNP MSP
Jean Turner, Strathkelvin and Bearsden

Opinion polls

Election results 

|-
| style="background-color:white" colspan=15 | 
|-
! rowspan=2 colspan=2 | Party
! colspan=5 | Constituencies
! colspan=5 | Regional additional members
! colspan=5 | Total seats
|-
! Votes !! % !! ± !! Seats !! ± !! Votes !! % !! ± !! Seats !! ± !! Total !! ± !! %
|-

|-
|style="text-align:left"; colspan="2" | Valid votes || 2,016,978 || 95.9 || 3.5 || colspan="2"|   || 2,042,804 || 97.1 || 2.3 || colspan="5"|  
|-
|style="text-align:left"; colspan="2" | Spoilt votes || 85,631 || 4.1 || 3.5 || colspan="2"|   || 62,038 || 2.9 || 2.3 || colspan="5"|  
|-
!style="text-align:left"; colspan="2" | Total || 2,102,609 || 100 ||   || 73 || – || 2,104,842 || 100 ||   || 56 || – || 129 || – || 100
|-
|style="text-align:left"; colspan="2" | Electorate/Turnout || 3,899,472 || 53.9 || 4.2 || colspan="2"|   || 3,899,472 || 54.0 || 4.3 || colspan="5"|  
|}

Turnout in the election was 51.7% in the constituency vote and 52.4% in the regional vote up from 2003 where the turnout was 49.4% in both the constituency and regional vote

Notes: Independents contested 17 seats and three regions. Scottish Greens contested 1 seat, Scottish Socialist Party contested 1 seat, Scottish Christian Party, Scottish Voice etc. contested a small number of seats. A number of local issue parties also stood in single constituencies. The Nine Per Cent Growth Party stood candidates on the regional lists, and had a candidate for the local council elections of the same year. Standing in the Glasgow Regional List the party finished last of 23 candidates, receiving only 80 votes (0.04%), a record low.

Constituency and regional summary

Central Scotland 

|-
! colspan=2 style="width: 200px"|Constituency
! style="width: 150px"|Elected member
! style="width: 300px"|Result
 
 
 
 
 

 
 
 
 
 

|-
! colspan="2" style="width: 150px"|Party
! Elected candidates
! style="width: 40px"|Seats
! style="width: 40px"|+/−
! style="width: 50px"|Votes
! style="width: 40px"|%
! style="width: 40px"|+/−%
|-

Glasgow 

|-
! colspan=2 style="width: 200px"|Constituency
! style="width: 150px"|Elected member
! style="width: 300px"|Result
 
 
 
 
 
 
 
 
 
 

|-
! colspan="2" style="width: 150px"|Party
! Elected candidates
! style="width: 40px"|Seats
! style="width: 40px"|+/−
! style="width: 50px"|Votes
! style="width: 40px"|%
! style="width: 40px"|+/−%
|-

Highlands and Islands 

|-
! colspan=2 style="width: 200px"|Constituency
! style="width: 150px"|Elected member
! style="width: 300px"|Result
 
 
 
 
 
 
 
 

|-
! colspan="2" style="width: 150px"|Party
! Elected candidates
! style="width: 40px"|Seats
! style="width: 40px"|+/−
! style="width: 50px"|Votes
! style="width: 40px"|%
! style="width: 40px"|+/−%
|-

Lothians 

|-
! colspan=2 style="width: 200px"|Constituency
! style="width: 150px"|Elected member
! style="width: 300px"|Result
 
 
 
 
 
 
 
 
 

|-
! colspan="2" style="width: 150px"|Party
! Elected candidates
! style="width: 40px"|Seats
! style="width: 40px"|+/−
! style="width: 50px"|Votes
! style="width: 40px"|%
! style="width: 40px"|+/−%
|-

Mid Scotland and Fife 

|-
! colspan=2 style="width: 200px"|Constituency
! style="width: 150px"|Elected member
! style="width: 300px"|Result
 
 
 
 
 
 
 
 
 
 

|-
! colspan="2" style="width: 150px"|Party
! Elected candidates
! style="width: 40px"|Seats
! style="width: 40px"|+/−
! style="width: 50px"|Votes
! style="width: 40px"|%
! style="width: 40px"|+/−%
|-

North East Scotland 

|-
! colspan=2 style="width: 200px"|Constituency
! style="width: 150px"|Elected member
! style="width: 300px"|Result
 
 
 
 
 
 
 
 
 
 

|-
! colspan="2" style="width: 150px"|Party
! Elected candidates
! style="width: 40px"|Seats
! style="width: 40px"|+/−
! style="width: 50px"|Votes
! style="width: 40px"|%
! style="width: 40px"|+/−%
|-

South of Scotland 

|-
! colspan=2 style="width: 200px"|Constituency
! style="width: 150px"|Elected member
! style="width: 300px"|Result
 
 
 
 
 
 
 
 
 
 

|-
! colspan="2" style="width: 150px"|Party
! Elected candidates
! style="width: 40px"|Seats
! style="width: 40px"|+/−
! style="width: 50px"|Votes
! style="width: 40px"|%
! style="width: 40px"|+/−%
|-

West of Scotland 

|-
! colspan=2 style="width: 200px"|Constituency
! style="width: 150px"|Elected member
! style="width: 300px"|Result
 
 
 
 
 
 
 
 
 
 

|-
! colspan="2" style="width: 150px"|Party
! Elected candidates
! style="width: 40px"|Seats
! style="width: 40px"|+/−
! style="width: 50px"|Votes
! style="width: 40px"|%
! style="width: 40px"|+/−%
|-

Incidents

Delayed counts
Some counts in the Western Isles (Barra & the Uists) were delayed because the chartered helicopter sent to pick up the ballot boxes was delayed by bad weather. The boxes were instead transferred by sea and road to be counted in Stornoway. The votes were announced around 12.00 on Friday 4 May.

Vandalism
A man smashed ballot boxes with a golf club at a polling station at Carrick Knowe in Corstorphine in Edinburgh. About 100 ballots were damaged, some having to be taped back together. The man was arrested on the scene.

High number of rejected votes
The number of 'invalid' ballot papers (residual votes) in this election was significantly higher than usual, with a total of 146,099 ballot papers (regional: 60,455 or 2.88%; constituency: 85,644 or 4.075%) being rejected, with some constituencies such as Glasgow Shettleston having rejection rates as high as 12.1%. For comparison, the rejected ballot paper rate in 2003 was 0.65% for regional ballot papers and 0.66% for constituency ballot papers. In total there were 16 constituencies where the number of rejected ballots exceeded the winning candidate's majority. This led to calls for an independent enquiry into the implementation of the new voting system. The BBC Scotland Chief Political Editor, Brian Taylor, described the situation as "a disgrace" during their Election Night coverage.

There are several reasons for the usually high levels of rejected ballots in the election. One primary reason is that both the regional and constituency ballots were placed on a single sheet of paper. A large-type instruction at the top indicated "you have two votes." Being told that they had two votes, far too many voters used both votes on parties in the regional list. Although a rough template of the ballot was provided to voters by VoteScotland prior to the election, many ballots in reality had subtle yet consequential differences. Taking the ballot from Glasgow Shettleston for example, although its layout is similar to the sample ballot it has many more parties on the regional ballot, giving the illusion that the list continues onto the next side (constituency ballot). Furthermore, instructions provided to voters using these sheets were abbreviated. While the brief written instructions remained, they were presented in a much smaller font size. The column headings moved above the bold lines defining the columns and the visual prompt of the split arrow leading to the two columns is completely missing. This misleading ballot was made more complicated by two additional features of the balloting: several small parties like the Green Party ran one or fewer candidates in the constituency seats and parties were able to choose to put the name of their leader instead of the name of the party in the label for the list seats (For example, the SNP was listed as "Alex Salmond for First Minister", rather than the party name). Such poor ballot design decisions contributed to a similarly higher rate of spoiled ballots in the 2000 United States presidential election in areas of Florida such as Miami-Dade and Duval counties.

Another reason presented was that local elections took place on the same day with a different voting system and different design. Whereas the parliamentary election asked voters to mark a cross, the local council elections asked voters to number/ rank their candidates, as the council elections were under the single transferable vote system. Undercutting this theory, however, was the fact that the invalid rate in the local elections was far lower than the parliamentary elections (although still greater than in previous local elections) despite single transferable vote being a new system for most voters.

A third proposed reason was that this was the first election where electronic counting of papers had taken place. Many blamed e-counting for the increase in rejected papers, in part because the new machine counting system abandoned many counts during the early hours of Friday morning before all results had been counted. Furthermore, the primary reason for the regional and constituency ballots being placed on the same sheet of paper is due to restrictions on the size of paper the machines could accurately scan. The main company concerned was DRS Ltd. Nevertheless, nearly all invalid ballots would have been spoiled no matter how they were counted. However, the last minute redesign of ballot papers that was blamed for the high number of rejections in two electoral regions was done to make electronic voting easier.

Threatened legal actions
On 5 May 2007, the BBC reported that Labour were considering legal action against some results (particularly Cunninghame North, where the SNP beat Labour by just 48 votes) due to the high number of rejected votes. A further challenge was expected from Mike Dailly from the Govan Law Centre, a member of the Labour Party, purportedly on behalf of voters in the Glasgow region. He said that the result should be challenged because there were over 10,000 rejected ballots which could have caused a different result if they had counted.  Tommy Sheridan of Solidarity was only 2,215 votes short of beating the Greens for the last place as an MSP.

There were no election petitions raised to challenge the results.

Election system 
There are 73 constituencies, each electing one Member of the Scottish Parliament (MSP) by the plurality (first past the post) system of election, which are grouped into eight regions.  These regions each elect seven additional member MSPs so as to produce an overall proportional result. The D'Hondt method is used to calculate which additional member MSPs the regions elect. Each constituency is a sub-division of a region; the additional members system is designed to produce proportional representation for each region, and the total number of MSPs elected to the parliament is 129.

The election was the first using constituencies (see Scottish Parliament constituencies and regions) that are not identical to constituencies of the House of Commons (Parliament of the United Kingdom). Scottish Westminster constituencies were replaced with a new set of generally larger constituencies, fewer in number, in 2005.

The Arbuthnott Commission reported in January 2006, concerning the multiplicity of voting systems and electoral divisions in Scotland. Council elections on the same day used Single Transferable Vote for the first time, but there was no change to the Holyrood election system, except regarding use of vote-counting machines, before the 2007 election. Scanners supplied by DRS Data Services Limited of Milton Keynes, in partnership with Electoral Reform Services, the trading arm of the Electoral Reform Society, were used to electronically count the paper ballots in both the Scottish Parliament general election and the Scottish council elections, which took place on the same day.

Top target seats of the main parties
Below are listed all the constituencies which required a swing of less than 5% from the 2003 result to change hands.

Many of the seats that changed hands are not listed here. For example, the Scottish National Party gained several seats (Stirling, Edinburgh East & Musselburgh, Gordon, Livingston and Argyll & Bute) with very large swings, yet did not gain any of their top three targets.

Labour targets

SNP targets

Conservative targets

Liberal Democrat targets

Election of First Minister
The Scottish Parliament officially met on 9 May, and met again on 14 May to elect a Presiding Officer. On 16 May, the Parliament met to hold the election of the First Minister. Four nominations were made: Annabel Goldie of the Conservatives, Jack McConnell of Labour, Nicol Stephen of the Liberal Democrats, and Alex Salmond of the Scottish National Party.

Salmond was elected in the second round of voting by 49 votes to McConnell's 46. 33 abstentions were recorded. The election provided for a minority administration which did not have the explicit support of Parliament. Salmond was supported in the election by the two Green MSPs. Otherwise, voting was conducted strictly along party lines.

Party leaders

Major parties
At time of dissolution of the Scottish Parliament at midnight on Monday 2 April 2007, there were five party 'groups' represented on the Parliament's Bureau: Labour (50), SNP (25), Conservative (17), LibDem (17), and the Greens (7). There was also one 'mixed' administrative grouping of 5 independent MSPs and 1 Scottish Senior Citizens Unity Party MSP.

Of the major party leaders in the Scottish Parliament, only one, Jack McConnell, of the Scottish Labour Party fought the 2003 Scottish Parliamentary election as leader. Nicol Stephen succeeded Jim Wallace as Deputy First Minister and Leader of the Scottish Liberal Democrats in June 2005, after the latter announced that he would not be contesting the 2007 election. Alex Salmond was elected leader of the Scottish National Party in 2004, with his deputy Nicola Sturgeon. Salmond previously led the SNP between 1990 and 2000, but stood down and was replaced by his preferred successor John Swinney, who headed the party between 2000 and 2004. After Swinney's resignation in 2004, Salmond announced that he would, once again contest the leadership and won the ballot of members in June 2004. Annabel Goldie was elected leader of the Scottish Conservatives in November 2005 after the resignation of the incumbent David McLetchie on 31 October 2005 after a row surrounding taxi expenses.

Other parties
Robin Harper and Shiona Baird were elected as Scottish Green Party Co-convenors in 2004, but as the sole Green MSP Robin Harper was effectively party spokesperson from 1999.

Colin Fox was elected as the Scottish Socialist Party Convenor in 2005. In 2006 Tommy Sheridan left the party to form Solidarity.

Party Manifestos
British National Party
Scottish Christian Party- Another Approach Restoring the Land of the Book
Scottish Conservative Party
Scottish Green Party - Act Now: Choose a Green Future
Scottish Labour Party- Building Scotland
Scottish Liberal Democrats- We think Scotland has a bright future
Scottish National Party - It's Time
Scottish Socialist Party- People Not Profit

See also
Members of the 3rd Scottish Parliament
Elections in Scotland
National Assembly for Wales election and 2007 United Kingdom local elections, which took place on the same day

References

External links
 Election 2007, a briefing by the Scottish Parliament Information Centre
 ScotlandVotes, by Weber Shandwick Public Affairs and Scotland on Sunday
 Scottish Voting Intention, by UKPollingReport, in association with YouGov
 VoteScotland, a Scottish Executive and Electoral Commission website
 Electoral Reform Society – Scotland
 Scottish elections 2007, at the BBC News website
 Election 2007, at The Herald  
 Holyrood Elections, at The Scotsman
 Election Supplement 2007
 Scottish Elections Between 1997 and present
  Links to Party manifestos for the election.

2007
2007 elections in the United Kingdom
2007 in Scotland
2000s elections in Scotland
May 2007 events in the United Kingdom